Yaren (in earlier times Makwa/Moqua) is a district of the Pacific island country of Nauru. It is the de facto capital of Nauru and is coextensive with Yaren Constituency.

History
The district was created in 1968. Its original name, Makwa (or Moqua), refers to Moqua Well, an underground lake and primary source of drinking water for Nauruan people.

Geography
Yaren is located in the south of the island. To the north of Yaren is Buada, to the east is Meneng and to the west is Boe.

Climate
Yaren has a marine tropical rainforest climate (Köppen Af) with hot, humid conditions across the year.

Administration
Yaren (and sometimes Aiwo) is usually listed as the capital of Nauru. However, this is incorrect; the republic does not have cities or an official capital. Yaren is accepted by the United Nations as the "main district".

English and Nauruan, the official languages of Nauru, are spoken in the district.

Government and administrative buildings
The following government offices are located in this district:

the Parliament House
the earth station
the administration offices
the police station
the fire station
the National Stadium
the Australian High Commission and Taiwanese Embassy
the Nauru International Airport, air terminal, and head office of Nauru Airlines

Constituency

Yaren also constitutes a political constituency. It returns two members to the Parliament of Nauru.

Main sights

The Moqua Well is situated in Yaren.

Education

The primary and secondary schools serving all of Nauru are Yaren Primary School in Yaren District (Years 1–3), Nauru Primary School in Meneng District (Years 4–6), Nauru College in Denigomodu District (Years 7–9), and Nauru Secondary School (Years 10–12) in Yaren District.

The Nauru Learning Village in Yaren houses the University of the South Pacific Nauru Campus, the Nauru Technical & Vocational Education Training Centre, and Nauru Secondary.

Personalities
Kieren Keke (born 1971), politician and medical doctor
Charmaine Scotty, politician
Dominic Tabuna (born 1980), politician

See also
 List of settlements in Nauru
 Moqua Well
 Nauru Museum

References

External links

 
Districts of Nauru
Populated places in Nauru
Capitals in Oceania
1968 establishments in Nauru
Populated places established in 1968